Rousettus bat coronavirus GCCDC1 is a species of coronavirus in the genus Betacoronavirus.

References

Betacoronaviruses